Violito Payla (born 8 January 1979 in Cagayan de Oro, Misamis Oriental) is an amateur boxer from the Philippines best known to win the Asian Games 2006 at flyweight.

At the 2002 Asian Games he beat Tulashboy Doniyorov but lost to Noman Karim. He competed at the 2004 Athens Olympics in the Flyweight (– 48 kg) division but lost his bout in the round of 32 to Tulashboy Doniyorov of Uzbekistan, 36-26. Payla qualified for the Athens Games by winning the gold medal at the 2004 Asian Amateur Boxing Championships in Puerto Princesa, Philippines. In the final he defeated South Korea's Kim Ki-Suk.

At the 2006 Asian Games he won the gold medal in the Flyweight division. He beat Yang Bo (boxer) who had beaten world champ Lee in the semis and upset 2003 world champion Somjit Jongjohor of Thailand in the final 31-15.

External links
 Profile on CBS
 sports-reference

References

1979 births
Boxers at the 2004 Summer Olympics
Olympic boxers of the Philippines
Living people
Asian Games medalists in boxing
Boxers at the 2002 Asian Games
Boxers at the 2006 Asian Games
Filipino male boxers
Sportspeople from Cagayan de Oro
Boxers from Misamis Oriental
Asian Games gold medalists for the Philippines
Medalists at the 2006 Asian Games
Southeast Asian Games bronze medalists for the Philippines
Southeast Asian Games medalists in boxing
Competitors at the 2001 Southeast Asian Games
Flyweight boxers